The Mesa Arizona Easter Pageant (Mesa Pageant) is an annual production of the Church of Jesus Christ of Latter-day Saints (LDS Church) entitled Jesus the Christ and staged on the grounds of the Mesa Arizona Temple. One of the six LDS pageants, the Mesa Pageant is now the largest annual outdoor Easter pageant in the world.

With a 450-member cast, the 65-minute pageant depicts the birth, life, death, and resurrection of Jesus Christ using song and dance.

History 
As documented in the book, "The Mesa Easter Pageant: 80 years of sharing the story of Jesus the Christ," the practice of holding an annual Easter celebration at the Mesa Arizona Temple grounds began in 1938. Previously, from 1928 through 1937, the Mutual Improvement Association (ages 17-24) of the Church of Jesus Christ of Latter-day Saints had held an Easter sunrise service at the Teachers College in Tempe (later to become Arizona State University); and, in 1930, the Arizona Republic reported that an Easter service would be presented by the Church's Second Ward choir on the lawn of the temple. Still, it was the sunrise service in 1938 that marked the beginning of an Easter celebration being hosted on the temple grounds every year for eight decades, excepting 1975, when the temple had been closed for remodeling and local leaders were asked to forgo the event that year.

Irwin Phelps, a local community college teacher and member took over control of the pageant in 1977, transitioning it into an evening event and writing a script for a play. His wife, Eileen Stonely Phelps, became the costume director, sewing dozens of costumes in her home each year. Each year, the even grew in size and grandeur, adding theatrical elements and staging, music, dance, and a cast of nearly 500--to earn the reputation of being the largest annual outdoor Easter pageant in the world. 

In 2018, the Mesa Pageant celebrated its 80th anniversary with 90,000 attendees. Because of renovation work on the Mesa Arizona Temple and grounds, the Mesa Pageant was cancelled for 2019, 2020 and 2021. The Mesa Pageant will continue under area leadership in 2022 following the completion of renovation of the Mesa Temple.

Production

The Mesa Pageant runs Tuesday through Saturday evenings during the two weeks just before Easter, performing completely in Spanish on the first Saturday evening. No donations are accepted and no tickets are required, although seating is first-come, first-served. The four-story, multi-level stage used for the pageant is a temporary installment on the temple grounds. It takes three weeks to assemble and is disassembled after each Easter season.

Auditions are required to participate in the Mesa Pageant, and all cast and crew positions are voluntary. Nearly 1,000 people auditioned in 2013 while only 475 (the largest cast to date) were invited back. While the cast is mostly composed of members of the Church of Jesus Christ of Latter-Day Saints, members of several other religious faiths participate in the production each year.

Participation in the Mesa Pageant is meant to enrich both the viewer and the cast and crew. Before each performance, the cast and crew gather in the chapel adjacent to the temple grounds for a devotional. A portion of the cast and crew is also assigned to visit with the crowd before and after the production each night. The director as of November 2013 is Jenee Prince.

See also

 List of pageants of The Church of Jesus Christ of Latter-day Saints
 Christian drama
 Easter Drama
 Passion play

References

External links
 Pageants Latter-day Saints Official site
 The Church of Jesus Christ of Latter-day Saints Official site

Culture of Mesa, Arizona
The Church of Jesus Christ of Latter-day Saints in Arizona
Latter Day Saint plays and pageants
Recurring events established in 1928
Stage portrayals of Jesus
Tourist attractions in Maricopa County, Arizona
1928 musicals